Óscar Andrés Rodríguez Quiñonez  (born May 20, 1981) is a Paraguayan politician. Since December 2019 he has been the current Acting Mayor (intendant) of the City of Asuncion, the capital of Paraguay. He holds a degree in Business Administration and another degree in Commercial Engineering, both from "Universidad Americana" in Asunción, Paraguay. 

He served his first term as municipal mayor, between December 2019 and July 2021, replacing Mario Ferreiro, due to the order of succession established in the municipal organic law due to the resignation of the last mayor. In the 2021 national elections he was elected for a second term which will conclude at the end of 2025.

Political career 
Óscar Rodríguez served for many years in public office and held important positions, such as Director of the Contracting Unit of the Supreme Court of Justice.

Municipal Board of Asuncion 
He was elected Municipal Councilor of Asunción in 2015. For two years he was president of the Municipal Board.

First Period as Mayor of Asunción 
In December 2019, he took over as Mayor of Asunción, due to the resignation of the last mayor. Initially it had to complete the corresponding period between 2019-2020  but due to the COVID-19 Pandemic, the Executive Power of Paraguay extended the mandate of the mayors and municipal councilors of all the districts of the republic for up to one year, who continued in the exercise. from office until the assumption of the new elected authorities in 2021.

Second Period as Mayor of Asunción 
In the Municipal Elections of 2021 with 122,353 votes, Óscar “Nenecho” Rodríguez was elected mayor of Asunción for the period 2021-2025.

Television 
Óscar "Nenecho" Rodríguez  participated as a contestant in television programmes like “Calle 7” and “Baila Conmigo.”

References 

1981 births
Living people
Paraguayan politicians